Ethel Simpson (2 September 1926 – 12 December 2017) was a pioneering Scottish journalist. She worked to break down gendered barriers within journalism and was one of the first female chief reporters at the Aberdeen Press and Journal.

Early life 
Ethel was born in Banff on 2 September 1926 to a farming family. She attended Keithhall Primary School and then Inverurie Academy. After completing a shorthand typing course at Webster's College, she joined the Aberdeen Press and Journal in 1944 at age seventeen.

Career 
Ethel then became a Junior Reporter for the Aberdeen Press and Journal in 1945, the first woman to do so. In 1955 and 1956, Ethel spent three months on a 10,000 tour of North Africa, writing about her travels. She worked her way up, eventually becoming the Chief Reporter of the Journal in 1975. Ethel pressed for gender equality in the newsroom, and protested when a female reporter was told to go home and change into a skirt. She retired in 1986.

Personal life 
Ethel had a daughter, Emma, and two grandsons. She was a staunch royalist and Conservative.

See also 
 Mamie Magnusson 
 Isabella 'Marie' Imandt

References 

Scottish journalists
Scottish women journalists
1926 births
2017 deaths